The 2008 edition of the Carrera Panamericana Mexican sports car racing event started in Tuxtla Gutiérrez, Chiapas and finished in Nuevo Laredo, Tamaulipas. This edition was composed by 7 stages. Bill Beilharz won this edition.

Results

Overall

By class

Stages

Carrera Panamericana
Carrera Panamericana
2008 in Mexican motorsport